The Tony Award for Best Choreography is awarded to acknowledge the contributions of choreographers in both musicals and plays. The award has been given since 1947, but nominees were not announced until 1956.

Winners and nominees

1940s

1950s

1960s

1970s

1980s

1990s

2000s

2010s

2020s

Award records

Multiple wins

8 Wins
 Bob Fosse

5 Wins
 Michael Bennett
 Gower Champion
 Michael Kidd

4 Wins
 Susan Stroman
 Tommy Tune

3 Wins
 Andy Blankenbuehler
 Kathleen Marshall
 Jerome Robbins

2 Wins
 Bob Avian
 Agnes de Mille
 Ron Field
 Bill T. Jones
 Joe Layton
 Jerry Mitchell
 Donald Saddler
 Christopher Wheeldon

Multiple nominations

11 Nominations
 Bob Fosse

10 Nominations
 Michael Bennett
 Susan Stroman

8 Nominations
 Graciela Daniele
 Michael Kidd
 Onna White

7 Nominations
 Rob Ashford
 Gower Champion
 Jerry Mitchell

6 Nominations
 Wayne Cilento
 Casey Nicholaw
 Tommy Tune

5 Nominations
 Patricia Birch
 Andy Blankenbuehler
 Christopher Gattelli
 Peter Gennaro
 Kathleen Marshall
 Rob Marshall

4 Nominations
 Bob Avian
 Ron Field
 Steven Hoggett
 Joe Layton

 Donald McKayle
 Jerome Robbins
 Donald Saddler
 Randy Skinner

3 Nominations
 Warren Carlyle
 Danny Daniels
 Agnes de Mille
 Carol Haney
 Bill T. Jones
 Henry LeTang
 Peter Darling

2 Nominations
 Robert Alton
 Matthew Bourne
 John Carrafa
 George Faison
 Savion Glover
 Denis Jones
 Dania Krupska
 Gillian Lynne
 Joey McKneely
 Dan Siretta
 Michael Smuin
 Twyla Tharp
 Sergio Trujillo
 Thommie Walsh
 Christopher Wheeldon
 Billy Wilson

See also
 Drama Desk Award for Outstanding Choreography
 Laurence Olivier Award for Best Theatre Choreographer

References

External links
 The American Theatre Wing's Tony Awards official website

Tony Awards
Choreography awards
Awards established in 1947
1947 establishments in the United States